Hon. Jan Epafras M. Mukwilongo is a Namibian politician and a business man. Founding leader and self-styled "Commander-in-Chief" of the Namibian Economic Freedom Fighters in 24 June 2014. He was elected to the 7th National Assembly in 2019. The NEFF is known for its left-wing economic views, including calls to nationalize Namibia's vast natural resources, anti-Chinese & Indian investors who the NEFF claim are destroying the Namibian local business, and anti-LGBT social views. In the Presidential election, which coincided with the National Assembly election, Mukwiilongo finished in 11th and last place with 1,026 votes (0.1%).

He is the nephew of Leonard Nangolo Mukwiilongo, who was the first governor of the Omusati Region.

In 2004, he was named to the executive committee of the Congress of Democrats, which was the official opposition at the time.

References

Year of birth missing (living people)
Living people
Members of the National Assembly (Namibia)
21st-century Namibian politicians
Congress of Democrats politicians
Candidates for President of Namibia
Racism in Africa